German submarine U-3503 was a Type XXI U-boat (one of the "Elektroboote") of Nazi Germany's Kriegsmarine, built for service in World War II. She was ordered on 6 November 1943, and was laid down on 17 June 1944 at F Schichau GmbH, Danzig, as yard number 1648. She was launched on 27 July 1944, and commissioned under the command of Oberleutnant zur See Hugo Deiring on 9 September 1944.

Design

Like all Type XXI U-boats, U-3503 had a displacement of  when at the surface and  while submerged. The submarine was powered by two MAN SE supercharged six-cylinder M6V40/46KBB diesel engines each providing , two Siemens-Schuckert GU365/30 double-acting electric motors each providing , and two Siemens-Schuckert silent running GV232/28 electric motors each providing .

U-3503 was fitted with six  torpedo tubes in the bow and four  C/30 anti-aircraft guns. She could carry twenty-three torpedoes or seventeen torpedoes and twelve mines. The complement was five officers and fifty-two men.

Fate

U-3503 was scuttled on 8 May 1945, west of Gothenburg, Sweden, in the Kattegat, as part of Operation Regenbogen. The U-boat had earlier been attacked by allied B-24 Liberator planes. The wreck was raised in 1946 and broken up in Sweden (which first had asked to keep it) on demand of the Allied governments.

The sea and marine museum Sjöfartsmuseet in Gothenburg still has the original Kriegsmarine flag from the U-boat, exhibited on one of the museum floors.

In popular culture
The closing track on Swedish musician Stefan Andersson's album Flygblad över Berlin is about the surrender of U-3503. The song is called "Den sista vargen" (The Last Wolf).

References

Bibliography

External links
 

Type XXI submarines
U-boats commissioned in 1944
U-boats sunk in 1945
World War II submarines of Germany
1944 ships
Ships built in Danzig
Operation Regenbogen (U-boat)
Ships built by Schichau
Maritime incidents in May 1945